As of 2023, Bolivia has 25 high-rise buildings above , most of which are located in La Paz and Santa Cruz de la Sierra.

The tallest Bolivian skyscraper is currently the 163.4-metre (536 ft) tall Green Tower, in La Paz.

Completed
This list ranks completed buildings in Bolivia that stand at least 100 metres (394 ft) tall.

Under construction
This list ranks buildings under construction in Bolivia that are planned to rise at least .

See also
List of tallest buildings in South America

References

Tallest
Bolivia
Bolivia